Senecauxia is a monotypic moth genus in the family Erebidae. Its only species, Senecauxia coraliae, is found in French Guiana. Both the genus and the species were first described by Hervé de Toulgoët in 1989.

References

Phaegopterina
Monotypic moth genera
Moths described in 1989
Moths of South America